Emma Blocksage, better known as Emma B (born 06 September 1980), is an English model and TV presenter. Since her entry into the entertainment industry in 1995, she has appeared on numerous magazine covers and TV programmes.  Her stage name is often confused with Spice Girl Emma Bunton and occasionally with that of radio presenter Emma Boughton, who is also known as "Emma B".

Modeling career
Emma Blocksage was spotted at about the time of her 15th birthday in April 1994 by Hastings model agent Martin Robinson in Bexhill's De La Warr Pavilion when she entered a modelling contest co-sponsored by his agency, Martin Enterprises—Studio 17.

Before the event had started, Martin Robinson saw her walking through the foyer and stated, "One day she will be a supermodel". Having contacted Elite Model Management, one of the world's best-known agencies, she subsequently won their "Look of the Year" in July 1995 at the age of 16. The win was followed by a lucrative modeling contract with Elite, resulting in the young model, now known as Emma B, embarking on a high-profile path in the industry.

As a fashion model, Emma B was in high demand and travelled the world, appearing in catwalk shows and ad campaigns for top designers, including Chanel, Prada, Valentino, Guess?, Dior, Jean Paul Gaultier, Westwood, Hamnett, and Bella Freud.

Her image has been on the covers of Vogue, Elle, Harper's Bazaar, Marie Claire and numerous others, while a lucrative lingerie contract with Debenhams featured her as their "lingerie face" for two years. This led to intense media interest and she soon became a favourite celebrity face and glamour model in the British tabloids and gossip pages.

As a result of her celebrity status, she became a "name" model, appearing regularly in such publications as FHM, Stuff, Maxim, Front, GQ, News of the World, Daily Star, The Sun, Closer, Nuts, Zoo and Donna.

In 2003, her calendar hit the top 5 best selling calendars for the year and sold out in all major outlets. She is currently a model for the Ann Summers chain of shops and, in 2004, she was signed by record label Warner Bros. and had a top 20 hit in the charts.

In 2012, Blocksage kicked off her bodybuilding career winning he bikini category at the UKBFF MuscleTalk Championships.

Television career
In 2004, after taking a break from the limelight to spend time with her mother and sister in Hastings, Emma B returned into the media spotlight.  As her popularity had risen with modelling, other media projects became available, including a recording contract with East West Records.  She has presented for ITV2 (The Mix, Flying Start), Sky One (Babes Behaving Badly, Celebrity Fear Factor UK), the Disney Channel and MTV. She made her acting debut in Channel 4's It's a Girl Thing, and her own fly-on-the-wall reality TV show Young, Hot and Talented.

After being lined up to star with then-lover, East 17 singer Brian Harvey in ITV1's summer 2004 version of I'm a Celebrity... Get Me Out of Here!, she took part in ITV1 reality TV flop Celebrity Wrestling. She also participated in Five's celebrity reality show The Farm, was the runner up in Sky One's Cirque de Celebrité in 2006 and has appeared on ITV Play's phone-in quiz show The Mint.

She has taken part in the second series of Channel 4's Celebrity Coach Trip which aired in October 2011.
She also took part in BBC's Snog Marry Avoid?

Personal life
Blocksage is the mother of two sons and is engaged to former classmate Ollie Oxley.

References

External links

English female models
People from Hastings
Living people
1979 births